Ab Zalu-ye Arab (also Romanized as Āb Zālū-ye ‘Arab; also known as Ab Zaloo Jahangiri, Āb Zālū, Āqā Bahrām, Nomreh Panj, and Nomreh-ye Panj) is a village in Jahangiri Rural District, in the Central District of Masjed Soleyman County, Khuzestan Province, Iran. At the 2006 census, its population was 96, in 19 families.

References 

Populated places in Masjed Soleyman County